fa:ویسکی لیک

Whiskey Lake is Intel's codename for a family of third 14 nm generation Skylake low-power mobile processors. Intel announced  Whiskey Lake on August 28, 2018.

Changes 
 14++ nm process, same as Coffee Lake
 Increased turbo clocks (300–600 MHz)
 14 nm PCH
 Native USB 3.1 gen 2 support (10 Gbit/s)
 Integrated Wi-Fi 802.11ac 160 MHz / WiFi 5 and Bluetooth 5.0
 Intel Optane Memory support

List of Whiskey Lake CPUs

Mobile processors 
The TDP for these CPUs is 15 W, but is configurable.

Core i5-8365U and i7-8665U support Intel vPro Technology

Pentium Gold and Celeron CPUs lack AVX2 support.

References 

Intel microarchitectures
Intel x86 microprocessors
X86 microarchitectures